Ryan Gore is an American Grammy award-winning mixer, engineer, and record producer based in Nashville, Tennessee. His studio credits range from country artists like Kacey Musgraves and Thomas Rhett, to pop, rock and R&B artists like Kelly Clarkson, Steven Tyler and Ne-Yo.

Selected discography

Singles  
Sam Hunt - "Take Your Time" (Mixing, engineering)
Kacey Musgraves - "Follow Your Arrow", "Merry Go 'Round" (Mixing, engineering)
Old Dominion - "Break Up with Him", "Song For Another Time", "Snapback", "No Such Thing as a Broken Heart" (Mixing, engineering)
Brett Eldredge - "Mean To Me" (Mixing, engineering)
Country Music Association (Multiple artists) - "Forever Country" (Mixing, engineering)
Miguel - "Waves" ft. Kacey Musgraves (Mixing, engineering)

Albums 
Sam Hunt – Montevallo (Mixing, engineering)
Thomas Rhett – It Goes Like This (Engineering)
Kacey Musgraves – Same Trailer Different Park and Pageant Material (Mixing, engineering)
Brothers Osborne – Pawn Shop (Mixing, engineering)
Jon Pardi – Write You A Song and California Sunrise (Mixing, engineering)
Old Dominion – Meat and Candy and Happy Endings (Mixing, engineering)
Lori McKenna – Lorraine (Mixing, engineering)
The Cadillac Three – The Cadillac Three and Bury Me In My Boots (Mixing, engineering)
Brett Eldredge – Bring You Back (Mixing, engineering)
Jake Owen – Barefoot Blue Jean Night and American Love (Engineering)
Brantley Gilbert – Halfway to Heaven (Mixing, engineering)
Kelly Clarkson – Piece By Piece (Engineering)
Ingrid Michaelson – It Doesn't Have to Make Sense (Engineering)
Ne-Yo – R.E.D. (Engineering)
Steven Tyler – We're All Somebody From Somewhere (Engineering)

Awards and nominations 
 Grammy WIN - Best Country Album 2013, Same Trailer, Different Park by Kacey Musgraves
 Grammy Nomination - Best Country Album 2016, Montevallo by Sam Hunt and Pageant Material by Kacey Musgraves
 CMA Nomination - Single of the Year 2017, "Dirt on My Boots" by Jon Pardi
 ACM Nomination - Audio Engineer of the Year 2019
 ACM Nomination - Album of the Year 2020, Heartache Medication by Jon Pardi

References 

American record producers

Year of birth missing (living people)
Living people